Pitcairnia spicata is a plant species in the genus Pitcairnia. It is endemic to the Island of Martinique in the West Indies.

Cultivars
 Pitcairnia 'Regia'

References

spicata
Flora of Martinique
Plants described in 1783